Peperomia venezueliana is a species of herb and hemiepiphyte subshrub from the genus Peperomia. It grows in wet tropical biomes. It was discovered by Casimir de Candolle in 1866, in Venezuela..

Etymology
Venezueliana came from the country "Venezuela". This refers to the species being discovered in Venezuela.

Distribution
Peperomia venezueliana is native to Venezuela and Colombia. In Colombia, specimens can be found at an altitude of 1000–2300 meters. In Venezuela, specimens can be found at an altitude of 350-1250 meters..

Venezuela
Carabobo
Monagas
Bolívar
Amazonas
Lara
Quebrada de Oro
Táchira
Junín
Quebrada Agua Blanca
Aragua
Colonia Tovar
Yaracuy
Sierra de Aroa
Mérida
Cerro El Toro
Anzoátegui
Miranda
Sucre
El Avila National Park
Cojedes
Ricaurte
Falcón
Guárico
Trujillo
Colombia
Antioquia
Envigado
Betania
Frontino
Caldas
Anorí
Magdalena
Santa Marta
Sierra de Onaca
Santander
Río Suratá valley
Meta
La Macarena
Tinigua National Park
Norte de Santander
Herrán

Peperomia longipes
Colombia
Magdalena
Santa Marta
Sierra de Ouaca

Peperomia ernstiana
Venezuela 
Aragua

Description
Leaves alternate, briefly petiolate, Oval lance, and Pointed tip. They are glabrous on both sides. It trails on the ground, dry stem, flattened, glabrous, and the edge of the leaves is 0,035.

Subtaxa
These subtaxa following varieties are accepted. 

Peperomia venezueliana var. aterrima 

Peperomia venezueliana var. venezueliana

References

venezueliana
Flora of South America
Flora of Venezuela
Flora of Colombia
Plants described in 1866
Taxa named by Casimir de Candolle